Gustave Besnard (11 October 1833, Rambouillet – 15 July 1903, Château du Rohu near Lorient) was a French admiral and Ministre de la Marine.

Biography 

From the time he joined the French Navy as a cadet at the École Navale in 1849, until his retirement date in 1898, Besnard served 50 years in the French Navy. After graduating from the École Navale in 1852, Besnard progressed rapidly in rank and commanded twelve warships (frigates, light cruisers, heavy cruisers) between 1867 and 1892, in all parts of the world (Mediterranean, North Atlantic, South Atlantic, Indochina, China). He held a number of prestigious shore positions such as Navy Chief of Staff (1881), Head of Navy Personnel (1887–1889), Préfet Maritime de Brest (1893–1895).

He directed naval support for the conquest of Madagascar (1895). He secured from Parliament the necessary credits to keep the fleets of the French Navy at operational strength and at immediate readiness. He won Parliament approval for setting up overseas Navy bases and strongpoints in many parts of the world: in particular the arsenal of Bizerte (Tunisia).

The opposite theory emphasizes that sea power is based on the large ships which decide battles, such as battleships and cruisers.

Besnard was clearly in favor of the latter theory. Speaking on the occasion of budget debates at the French Parliament between 1895 and 1898, Admiral Besnard pushed forward naval armaments programs in which battleships and cruisers represented over 80% of total funds. He confined torpedo boats to their normal role in coast defense.

References

Sources
 Vice-amiral Charles Touchard, Notice sur la carrière du Vice-amiral Besnard, Paris, Imprimerie E. Desfossés, 1923, 10 pages
 Archives Nationales, Base LEONORE, Cote LH/221/57
 Service Historique de la Défense, Vincennes, Cote SHD MV 87 GG2/1
 Félix Faure, Journal à l'Élysée (1895-1899), Paris, Éditions des Équateurs, 2009, page 333
 Frédéric Saffroy, « Clémenceau et la stratégie navale - le torpilleur contre le cuirassé », Cols Bleus Marine Nationale, 1er juin 2018
 Journal Officiel de la République Française, Lois et décrets, 30 mars 1897, Tableau des constructions neuves annexé à la Loi de finances du 29 mars 1897, pages 1888–1912.

1833 births
1903 deaths
People from Rambouillet
École Navale alumni
French Naval Ministers
French Navy admirals
Grand Officiers of the Légion d'honneur
French military personnel of the Franco-Prussian War